The Monument of the Eponymous Heroes, located in the Ancient Agora of Athens, Greece and adjacently situated near the Metroon (old Bouleuterion), was a marble podium that bore the bronze statues of the ten heroes representing the tribes of Athens. Being an important information center for the ancient Athenians, it was used as a monument where proposed legislation, decrees and announcements were posted.

Names of the ten heroes

 Erechtheus
 Aegeus (Theseus' father)
 Pandion (usually assumed to be one of the two legendary kings of Athens, Pandion I or Pandion II)
 Leos
 Acamas (son of Theseus)
 Oeneus
 Cecrops II
 Hippothoon
 Aias (Ajax)
 Antiochus (a son of Heracles)

References

External links

 Greece-athens.com

Landmarks in Athens
Ancient Greek buildings and structures in Athens
Ancient Agora of Athens